Kokrajhar district is an administrative district in Bodoland Territorial Region of Assam. It is predominantly inhabited by the Boro tribe. It has two civil sub-divisions namely Parbatjhora and Gossaigaon and five revenue circles namely Kokrajhar, Dotma, Bhaoraguri, Gossaigaon and Bagribari.

History
Kokrajhar was a part the undivided Goalpara district. In 1957, under the administration of Bimala Prasad Chaliha as the Chief Minister of Assam, three sub-divisions were created one of which was Kokrajhar. This sub-division was made into a district on 1 July 1983.

On 29 September 1989 Bongaigaon district was created from parts of Kokrajhar and Goalpara.

Geography
Kokrajhar district is located on the northern bank of the Brahmaputra river. It forms the gateway to the Seven Sister States. Kokrajhar shares its boundary with Bongaigaon (now known as Chirang), Dhubri, West Bengal, Barpeta and Bhutan. Part of the district is made up of Manas National Park.

Economy

In 2006 the Indian government named Kokrajhar one of the country's 250 most backward districts (out of a total of 640). It is one of the eleven districts in Assam currently receiving funds from the Backward Regions Grant Fund Programme (BRGF).

Divisions
There are four Assam Legislative Assembly constituencies in this district: Gossaigaon,  Kokrajhar West,  Kokrajhar East, and Sidli. All but Gossaigaon are designated for scheduled tribes. All four are in the Kokrajhar Lok Sabha constituency.

Demographics

According to the 2011 census Kokrajhar district has a population of 887,142, roughly equal to the nation of Fiji. This gives it a ranking of 467th in India (out of a total of 640). Its population growth rate over the decade 2001-2011 was 5.19%. Kokrajhar has a sex ratio of 958 females for every 1000 males, and a literacy rate of 66.63%. Scheduled Castes and Scheduled Tribes make up 3.33% and 31.41% of the population respectively.

The district is multi-ethnic, with no majority ethnic group but Bodo people form a plurality. Kokrajhar is known as a global center of Bodo culture and language and serves as the capital of Bodoland Territorial Council. Most of the indigenous communities of Kokrajhar are Hindu, with a small Christian minority and few Muslim Minority belongs to Jharua (Koch Muslim), Goria and Deshi Community. Almost all of the Bengalis are Muslim, while more than 90% of the Santhals are Christian.

Religion

Languages 

According to the 2011 census, 28.39% of the population spoke Boro, 23.78% Assamese, 17.78% Bengali, 11.9% Santali, 7.62% Rajbongshi, 2.58% Rabha, 1.76% Hindi, 1.65% Nepali, 1.42% Kurukh and 1.21% Garo as their first language.

Flora and fauna
It shares the park with four other districts.

Notable people 

Bineshwar Brahma, poet and author
Upendranath Brahma, Bodo leader
Ranjit Shekhar Mooshahary, IPS officer, director general of National Security Guards and Border Security Force, former governor of Meghalaya.
Kameshwar Brahma, writer, president of Bodo Sahitya Sabha and Padma Shri recipient
 Kalicharan Brahma , renowned social and religious reformer of Parbatjhora

See also
 Bengali language
Bodo people
Bodo culture
Bodo language
Bodo Sahitya Sabha
Bodoland
Dholmara

References

External links
Kokrajhar District Administration site

kokrajhar. In

 
Districts of Assam
1983 establishments in Assam
Minority Concentrated Districts in India
Bodoland